The  was a two-row, 14-cylinder air-cooled radial engine built by the Mitsubishi Aircraft Company for the Imperial Japanese Army Air Service (IJAAS) and the Imperial Japanese Navy Air Service (IJNAS) in the early 1930s. Like many aircraft engines in Japan, there were multiple designations for this engine. The company model designation  was A6(7) while it was an experimental engine project. Once accepted, it was known as the "Shinten" or MK1 by the IJNAS, and Ha6 by the IJAAS.

Design and development
The Mitsubishi Shinten was a development of the early Mitsubishi Kinsei (A4) engine.

Initially the Ha6 was to be installed on the IJAAS Mitsubishi Ki-21 bomber aircraft, but it was decided to use a competing engine, the Nakajima Ha5 instead. Furthermore, Mitsubishi was ordered to produce Nakajima's engine at its factory under license. So only 113 Shinten/Ha6 engines were made and they were installed on only few types of aircraft.

IJNAS engine naming method

It was the Imperial Japanese Navy's common practice to refer to its engines by name. The Japanese method of identifying model numbers of aircraft engines is unique in that the model number always has two digits and may be followed by one or more letters.  The first digit represents the major version of the engine and the second number represents the minor version of that model engine.

The first model number assigned to an engine is always 11, meaning the first major design and first minor version of that design. A major change to the design increments the first number and resets the second number to one.  A minor change to the engine model increments the second number by one.  If a very minor change is made, suffix letters are added after the model number. When a special modification is made, the model number is followed by the suffix 'kai', as in the Shinten Model 21kai, which decodes as the second model of the Shinten engine, 1st revision, specially modified.

IJAAS engine naming method

The Imperial Japanese Army Air Service referred to its engines by their engine (Japanese:Hatsudoki abbreviated Ha) model number. Ha numbers were assigned in sequence as the engine design was accepted.  This engine (Ha6) would be the 6th engine accepted by the IJAAS.

Variants
 Shinten 11 (A7)
 920 hp at 2300 rpm (take-off), 700 hp at 2100 rpm (normal). 1934 4 made
 Shinten 21 (A6)
 950 hp at 2320 rpm (take-off), 800 hp at 2150 rpm (normal).
 Shinten 21kai (A6)
 1200 hp at 2360 rpm (take-off), 1020 hp at 2250 rpm (normal). 1934–1939 109 made

Applications
 Mitsubishi Ki-21
 Yokosuka H5Y

Specifications (Shinten)

See also

References

Notes

Bibliography 
 Matsuoka Hisamitsu, Nakanishi Masayoshi. The History of Mitsubishi Aero Engines 1915–1945. Miki Press, Japan, 2005. 
 

 

1930s aircraft piston engines
Aircraft air-cooled radial piston engines
Shinten